Erman Rašiti may refer to:

Given name
 Erman Bulucu (born 1989), Turkish footballer
 Erman Eltemur (born 1993), Turkish karateka
 Erman Güraçar (born 1974), Turkish footballer
 Erman Kılıç (born 1983), Turkish footballer
 Erman Kunter (born 1956), Turkish basketball player
 Erman Öncü (born 1976), Turkish professor 
 Erman Özgür (born 1977), Turkish footballer

Surname
 Adolf Erman (1854-1937), German Egyptologist
 Cem Erman (born Süleyman Faik Durgun in 1947–2011), Turkish film actor
 Georg Adolf Erman (1806-1877), German physicist, father of  Adolf and Wilhelm Erman
 John Erman (1935–2021), American television and film director, actor and producer 
 Paul Erman (1764-1851), German physicist, father of Georg Adolf Erman
 Verda Erman (1944–2014), Turkish classical pianist

Places
 Dallag Erman, a settlement in the Dzau district of South Ossetia

See also
 Max Ehrmann
 Bart D. Ehrman

Turkish masculine given names